A fifth week event is a novelty comic book promotion.

Comic publishers schedule releases in four-week cycles, releasing on a particular day of the week (e.g., every Wednesday). In the event that a month has more than four weeks (i.e., a fifth Wednesday), publishers often sell unusual comics to fill in the scheduling gap.

The fifth week event has been discontinued since longer crossovers, such as Blackest Night, run for months at a time, requiring more tie-ins and fewer simultaneous crossovers.

DC Comics
In the 1990s, DC Comics published 4 monthly Superman titles. The interlocking stories created a weekly narrative that continued throughout the year, but that publishing schedule accounted for only 48 out of the 52 weeks per year. With 4 months each year containing a fifth Wednesday (the day comic books go on sale in America,) DC introduced a fifth Superman title, Superman: The Man of Tomorrow to fill in the skip weeks.

The first skip week events were linked to a range of existing (or proposed) titles with a shared theme: New Year's Evil focused on villains and GirlFrenzy on female characters from the participating titles.

In the midst of the DC vs. Marvel crossover, the two companies combined their universes creating new titles and characters for Amalgam Comics. DC also created its own alternate universe with in-name-only versions of their major characters with Tangent Comics.

Later skip week events focused a story (usually with stand-alone parts) sometimes with a framing story or related to a specific title, and as time went on the comics would be spread over the entire month. Often a pair of "bookend" issues would tell the beginning and end of the framing story.

Many skip weeks would feature a consistent cover design across all books in the event. New Year's Evil used black backgrounds, menacing profiles of the main characters, and an elaborate red border design at the top. Tangent Comics made a special effort to break conventions, using a fifth ink color to create a silver background, placing the titles in the middle of the cover instead of at the top, and adding descriptive information such as book dimensions and indicia in multiple languages that might be mandated by an alternate universe's publishing industry.

Vertigo
While Vertigo released a number of comics in the fifth week of December 1999, under the title V2K, some of them were the first issues of limited series, rather than one-shots for that month.

Examples
 DC Comics
 New Year's Evil (late 1997, cover-dated 1998, 8 one-shots)
 GirlFrenzy (1998, 7 one-shots)
 Young Justice: The Secret (1998)
 The Kingdom (late 1998, cover-dated 1999, follow-up to Kingdom Come)
 Amalgam Comics (published with Marvel)
 Tangent (1997, 9 one-shots; 1998, 9 one-shots)
 Justice Society Returns (1999)
 Sins of Youth (2000)
 Green Lantern: Circle of Fire (2000)
 Silver Age (2000)
 Justice League of ? (2001, alternate meanings of JLA such as Justice League of Aliens, Justice League of Amazons, etc.)
 Power Surge (2002)
 V2K (Vertigo, 1999)
 Marvel
 various Marvels Comics (comics as they supposedly appear within the Marvel Universe)
 Marvel Knights 2099 (Marvel, 2004)
 Marvel Mangaverse (Marvel, 2001)
 What If? (Marvel, 7 one-shots)
 X-Men: Black Sun (Marvel, 2000)

References

Comics terminology